Villaricos is a coastal district located in Cuevas del Almanzora, Spain. On 5 April 1863 the barque Candahar was driven ashore at Villaricos and broke in two. By 2018 it has 626 inhabitants, 335 men and 291 women. Baria, an archaeological site, was found in Villaricos.

References

Underwater diving sites in Spain
Mediterranean port cities and towns in Spain
Populated places in the Province of Almería
Localities of Spain